DMFA may refer to:
Society of Mathematicians, Physicists and Astronomers of Slovenia, or Društvo matematikov, fizikov in astronomov Slovenije
Dimethylformamide, a chemical compound used as a solvent